Rheydt Hauptbahnhof is a railway station in Mönchengladbach, Germany. Mönchengladbach is the only city in Germany that has two stations called Hauptbahnhof, due to the merger of the city of Rheydt into Mönchengladbach in the late 1970s.

Rheydt Hbf and Mönchengladbach
After the merging of the two cities, the station was not renamed to Mönchengladbach-Rheydt  as in all other cases where cities were merged in the 1970s. The Deutsche Bundesbahn retained the name (and the name of suburban stops such as Rheydt-Odenkirchen); Mönchengladbach has two "main stations", Mönchengladbach Hauptbahnhof and Rheydt Hauptbahnhof.

Operational usage
The station is served by the following lines:
 Aachen – Mönchengladbach (KBS 485)
 Rheydt – Köln-Ehrenfeld (KBS 465)
 Rheydt – Dalheim (– Antwerpen) (KBS 487)

Only regional services call at the station. It is at the southwestern border of the Verkehrsverbund Rhein-Ruhr, with services extending into the area of the Aachener Verkehrsverbund.

References

Railway stations in North Rhine-Westphalia
Buildings and structures in Mönchengladbach
Railway stations in Germany opened in 1852
1852 establishments in Prussia